Georg Gothein (15 August 1857 – 22 March 1940) was a left-liberal German politician of Jewish origin. He was a member of the liberal political parties, including Progressive People's Party and German Democratic Party and served as the minister of treasury between February 1919 and 1920.

Early life
Gothein was born in Neumarkt in Schlesien, Silesia, on 15 August 1857. He hailed from a Jewish family. He received a degree in engineering.

Career
Gothein had various waterway related business activities in Silesia. He was a liberal politician and first became a member of the Progressive People's Party. In 1894 he was elected to the Prussian parliament. Between 1901 and 1918 he was a member of the German Reichstag. Gothein was among the founders of the German Committee for the Promotion of Jewish Settlement in Palestine which was established in April 1918. He was also a member of its central board, and the committee was dissolved in 1919. 

Gothein was confounder of the German Democratic Party, a liberal political party. In February 1919 he was appointed minister of treasury to the cabinet led by Philipp Scheidemann. He served in the post until 1920. He was one of the leaders of the Mitteleuropäischer Wirtschaftstagung (German: Central European Economic Union) which had been established in 1928 to promote the economic development in Central Europe. He was active in the organization until 1931 when Tilo von Wilmowsky replaced him in the post.

Later years, personal life and death
After retiring from politics he worked as a journalist. He was a follower of the Protestant church. 

Gothein was married and had four daughters. He died in Berlin on 22 March 1940 and was buried at the Stahnsdorf South-Western Cemetery.

References

20th-century German journalists
1857 births
1940 deaths
German Democratic Party politicians
Government ministers of Germany
Jewish German politicians
German Protestants
Progressive People's Party (Germany) politicians
People from Środa Śląska County
Political party founders
19th-century German engineers
19th-century German businesspeople